The 1979 Australian Hard Court Championships, also known as the Tasmanian Open, was a men's tennis tournament that was played on the Grand Prix tennis circuit from 1 January until 7 January 1979. The event was held at the Doman Tennis Centre in Hobart, Australia and was played on outdoor hardcourts, this was the 35th edition. First-seeded Guillermo Vilas won the singles title and earned $8,000 first-prize money.

Finals

Singles
 Guillermo Vilas defeated  Mark Edmondson 6–4, 6–4
 It was the 1st singles title of the year and the 43rd of his career.

Doubles
 Phil Dent /  Bob Giltinan defeated  Guillermo Vilas /  Ion Ţiriac 8–6 (Pro set)

References

External links
 ITF tournament edition details

Australian Hard Court Championships
Sports competitions in Tasmania
Sport in Hobart